Carenum rectangulare is a species of ground beetle in the subfamily Scaritinae, found in Australia. It was described by William John Macleay in 1864.

References

rectangulare
Beetles described in 1864